"When Love Comes to Town" is a song by Irish rock band U2 featuring blues guitarist B.B. King. It is the twelfth track from U2's 1988 album, Rattle and Hum, and was released in 1989 as the record's third single. The song was recorded at the historic Sun Studio in Memphis. "When Love Comes to Town" reached number one in the Irish Singles Chart, number six in the UK Singles Chart, number ten in the Dutch Top 40, and number two in the US Mainstream Rock Tracks chart.

History
On the extended "Live from the Kingdom Mix", Little Richard is featured preaching, rapping in funky rhyme style, and singing background vocals amid Maceo Parker's saxophone playing. The single contained two different versions of the Patti Smith song "Dancing Barefoot". The 7" and cassette featured the long version, while the 12" and CD contained the short version. While U2 has stopped regularly playing it live, it continued to be featured in B.B. King concerts. During the Lovetown Tour concerts, this song would be played, usually along with "Angel of Harlem" and "Love Rescue Me", in an encore featuring B.B. and his band.

Like the song "Van Diemen's Land", this song originally featured an extra verse:

When I woke up I was sleeping on the street
I felt the world was dancing, and I was dirt beneath their feetWhen I woke up I saw the Devil looking downBut my Lord He played guitar the day love came to townThis verse was sung during the song's premiere in Fort Worth, Texas on U2's Joshua Tree Tour and does not appear in the studio version or subsequent live performances.Cash Box'' described the song as a "solid blues rumble."

Live
The debut performance took place on 24 November 1987 in Fort Worth, Texas during the concert's encore and B.B. King joined U2 to perform the song. On 1989's Lovetown Tour, the song again featured during the encore and was played with B.B. King.  It was played at 46 of the 47 shows; the only concert it missed was 18 December 1989 in Amsterdam, as the show concluded prematurely due to Bono suffering vocal problems.

On the next tour, 1992-93's Zoo TV Tour, "When Love Comes to Town" did not debut until the second-last concert of the first leg on 21 April 1992 in Tacoma. It appeared only infrequently on the second leg, in Europe, but on the third leg, in North America, it was performed frequently and this was continued on the fourth leg return to Europe.  The Zoo TV Tour version of the song was stripped down in comparison to previous versions and was performed on a b-stage in the midst of the crowd. U2 would not perform the song for years after the fourth leg's final show on 28 August 1993 in Dublin, although B.B. King continued to play the song at his live shows.

On 26 October 2008, Bono and the Edge rejoined B.B. King to play the song for the Thelonious Monk Institute of Jazz Founders Award.

After King died on 14 May 2015, U2 paid tribute to him during a show in Vancouver the following night during the Innocence + Experience Tour by playing "When Love Comes to Town" for the first time in 23 years. The song was played three more times on the tour. The song was played at a promotional appearance at the Apollo Theater in New York during the Experience + Innocence Tour. The song was played with the Sun Ra Arkestra.

Track listing

Personnel
 U2
 Bono - lead vocals, guitar
 The Edge - guitar
 Adam Clayton - bass
 Larry Mullen Jr. - drums, percussion
 Additional musicians
 B.B. King - additional vocals, and guitar
 Rebecca Evans Russell - backing vocals

Charts

Weekly charts

Year-end charts

See also
List of covers of U2 songs - When Love Comes to Town

References

1989 singles
U2 songs
B.B. King songs
Joss Stone songs
Male vocal duets
Island Records singles
Songs written by Bono
Songs written by the Edge
Songs written by Adam Clayton
Songs written by Larry Mullen Jr.
1988 songs
Music videos directed by Phil Joanou
Song recordings produced by Jimmy Iovine